Liu Qiang may refer to:

 Liu Qiang (born 1961) (刘强), Vice-Mayor of Chongqing
 Liu Qiang (born 1964), Vice-Governor of Liaoning
 Liu Qiang (boxer), born 1982
 Liuqiang, a form of Chinese opera from Qingdao

See also
 Liu Qiong, actor